Salehabad or Salihabad or Salhabad or Salahabad may refer to:

Iran

Chaharmahal and Bakhtiari Province
Salehabad, Chaharmahal and Bakhtiari, a village in Kuhrang County

Fars Province
Salehabad, Arsanjan, a village in Arsanjan County
Salehabad, Estahban, a village in Estahban County
Salehabad, Fasa, a village in Fasa County
Salehabad, Neyriz, a village in Neyriz County

Golestan Province
Salehabad, Golestan, a village in Kalaleh County

Hamadan Province
Salehabad, Hamadan, Iran
Salehabad District (Hamadan Province), Iran
Salehabad Rural District (Hamadan Province), Iran

Hormozgan Province
Salehabad, Bastak
Salehabad, Hajjiabad

Ilam Province
Salehabad, Ilam
Salehabad District (Ilam Province)

Isfahan Province
Salehabad, Natanz, a village in Natanz County

Kerman Province
Salehabad, Baft, a village in Baft County
Salehabad, Fahraj, a village in Fahraj County
Salehabad, Sirjan, a village in Sirjan County

Kermanshah Province
Salehabad, Kermanshah, a village in Kermanshah County

Khuzestan Province

Kurdistan Province
Salehabad, Baneh, a village in Baneh County
Salehabad, Kamyaran, a village in Kamyaran County
Salehabad, Saqqez, a village in Saqqez County

Lorestan Province
Salehabad, Lorestan, Iran
Salehabad Amid Ali, Lorestan, Iran

Markazi Province
Salehabad, Arak, a village in Arak County
Salehabad, Ashtian, a village in Ashtian County
Salehabad, Saveh, a village in Saveh County

Mazandaran Province
Salehabad, Sari, a village in Sari County
Salehabad, Tonekabon, a village in Tonekabon County

Razavi Khorasan Province
Salehabad, Razavi Khorasan, a city in Torbat-e Jam County
Salehabad Rural District (Razavi Khorasan Province), in Torbat-e Jam County
Salehabad, Gonabad
Salehabad, Mazul, Nishapur County
Salehabad, Rivand, Nishapur County
Salehabad-e Bozorg, Sabzevar County
Salehabad County

Semnan Province
Salehabad, Damghan
Saleh Abad, Damghan
Salehabad, Shahrud
Salehabad, Beyarjomand, Shahrud County

Tehran Province
Salehieh, a city in Tehran province
Salehabad, Damavand, Tehran province, Iran
Salehabad, Pishva, Tehran province, Iran
Salehabad, Qarchak, a village in Qarchak County
Salehabad, alternate name of Mehrdasht, Tehran, Iran
Salehabad-e Hesar-e Shalpush, Tehran province, Iran
Salehabad-e Seyyedabad, Tehran province, Iran
Salehabad-e Sharqi, a village in Rey County
Salehabad Rural District (Baharestan County), Tehran province

West Azerbaijan Province
Salehabad, Khoy, a village in Khoy County
Salehabad, Urmia, a village in Urmia County

Yazd Province
Salehabad, Yazd, a village in Taft County

Zanjan Province
Salehabad, Zanjan, a village in Khodabandeh County

Pakistan
Salehabad, Pakistan

See also
Solhabad (disambiguation)